Hévíz–Balaton Airport , previously also known as Sármellék International Airport, is an international airport in Hungary located west of Lake Balaton,  south-southwest of the village of Sármellék, Zala County and Keszthely. It gains importance due to the proximity of Lake Balaton, Hungary's most important holiday resort and the thermal spas of Hévíz and Zalakaros.

History
A military airport was located here in the 1940s. It was paved in the 1950s and functioned as a Hungarian military airport until 1960, and as a Soviet military airport between 1960 and the autumn of 1990. The current runways were constructed in 1982.

Sármellék International Airport had operated as a public airport since 1991 and became the second international airport of the country on 15 May 2002 after Budapest Ferenc Liszt International Airport. The airport is owned by the local governments of Sármellék and Zalavár since August 2002, operated by an Irish-Hungarian investment group, Cape Clear Aviation Ltd., since 2004.

In December 2005, Ryanair announced three weekly scheduled flights from London–Stansted, but the route was cut in October 2006, along with flights from Hahn.

Due to financial problems, the airport closed over the winter period 2008–09, then closed indefinitely on 10 October 2009. A new buyer was then sought for the facility. It reopened, however, in April 2010. In the next two winters it closed, but it reopened again for the spring and summer months of 2011 and 2012.

Since April 2012, the airport has been known by its new name: Hévíz–Balaton Airport.
During summer 2022, Wizz Air flew to Dortmund, but the route was cancelled later in the year.

Airlines and destinations

As of December 2022, there are no longer any regular commercial passenger flights to or from Heviz-Balaton. The airport used to be served by seasonal charter services from Western Europe, especially Germany, in recent years.
Flight passengers can be transported to their holiday accommodation by transfer buses or by taxis waiting outside the airport building. A government decision in 2016 set the deadline of 2022 for the construction of a railway ring around Lake Balaton. As of 2017, there is still no decision as to whether a railway station at the airport would be part of the Balaton Rail Ring.

Statistics

References

External links 

 
 
 

Airports in Hungary
Soviet Air Force bases
Hungary–Soviet Union relations
Military installations of the Soviet Union in other countries